is a Japanese anime television series produced by Toei Animation, billed as the nineteenth installment in the Pretty Cure franchise. It is directed by Toshinori Fukazawa and written by Sawako Hirabayashi, and premiered on ANN on February 6, 2022 to January 29, 2023, succeeding Tropical-Rouge! Pretty Cure in its initial time slot. The series' main themes are cuisine, cooking, gratitude, and sharing while being the second series to use food as its main motif since Kirakira Pretty Cure a la Mode. It was succeeded by Soaring Sky! Pretty Cure on February 5, 2023.

Story
Together, the three become Pretty Cures in order to stop the Bundle Gang from capturing all the Recipepe and to bring the Recipe-Bon back from their clutches.

Characters

Pretty Cures
 

The main protagonist. Yui is a 13-year-old, 2nd-year middle school student. Her family owns a diner, and she is an only child.

 

Kokone is a fashionable, cool kid. She's a 14-year-old and 2nd year middle school student who is characterized by her love of  make-up and cute things.

 

Ran is a 14-year-old and 2nd-year middle school student whose family owns a ramen shop.

 

Amane is shown to be a reliable 15-year-old and 3rd year middle school student with a strong sense of justice. Her family owns a fruit parlor, and she has two older brothers.

Energy Fairies

The fox-like Energy Fairy of Rice, who from episode 3 onwards also has the ability to transform into a human girl.

The dog-like Energy Fairy of Bread.

The dragon-like Energy Fairy of Noodles.

CooKingdom

A man from CooKingdom who came in search of the stolen Recipe-Bon. He has high beauty standards and knows cosmetology.

The King of the CooKingdom.

The Queen of the CooKingdom

The Cook Fighter Apprentice of the CooKingdom.

Rosemary's master and the leader of the Cook Fighters.

 

The ancestor of Kome-Kome II known for her extraordinary power. Twenty years earlier, she had traveled with Ginger and the other Energy food fairies to Oishina Town. After learning from Yui and the others from the future that the food and the memories associated with it would be in danger, she decides to use all her energy to protect Oishiina Town and sacrifice herself, giving birth to the current Kome-Kome.

Cook Fighters
 

Takumi is Yui's childhood friend and a 3rd year middle school student. His family runs a guest house.

Bundoru Gang
The series' main antagonists. The  are a group of phantom thieves responsible for the disappearance of the Recipe-Bon in the CooKingdom. Their aim on obtaining it is to monopolize every dish for themselves by capturing all the Recipepes.

Leaders

The main antagonist of the series. The greedy leader of the Bundoru Gang who wants to collect all of the Recipepes so he can own all types of cuisines. In Episode 44, Godatz is eventually defeated and lost the two Delicious Stones, turning him back into his original self and was arrested for his crimes.

Generals

The second-in-command of the Bundoru Gang who has an insidious way of speaking. In Episode 42, she was betrayed by Godatz.

The self-proclaimed genius of the Bundoru Gang who invents new gadgets to make the Ubauzo stronger. In Episode 28, it was revealed that he was once a CooKingdom resident and was finally arrested in the end. In Episode 37, he escaped from prison when Secretoru was going to attack him and then he lets the Cures send him back.

The cheerful robot of the Bundoru Gang who was created by Narcistoru and powered by a Delicious Stone. Spiritoru was originally programmed with Narcistoru's tastes in mind as well as being very kind with cheerleader-like tendencies. In Episode 27, he was unfortunately deactivated by Narcistoru who abruptly removes his Delicious Stone. In Episode 28, Secretoru later decides to restore him with another Special Delicious Stone so he can go on missions again but after Secretoru reprogrammed him, Spiritoru became serious and more task-oriented. Eventually in Episode 45, he was reprogrammed and becomes a happy robot again, who has understood the goodness of sharing food with others.

Underlings 

The small robots of the Bundoru Gang.

Monsters

The series' main monsters. Their name is based on the word . They are created by the Bundle Gang Generals using the stolen Recipepes and the Bundle Gang container. Upon being purified by the Cures, they say  and also freeing a Recipepe from the container. In Episode 10, after Gentle's container received an upgrade, the Ubauzo has become stronger. These are created from the bento box of the Bundle Gang members when they lend their power by saying ". The box changes to be completely purple with a yellow line, with the Bundle Gang logo and sides that look like horns. In Episode 13, the new upgrade type called  is summoned by Narcistoru. In Episode 17, Narcistole is able to fuse two possessed objects to create a stronger Motto Ubauzo. In Episode 25, Spiritole is able to fuse a cooking object and a non cooking object to create a even stronger Motto Ubauzo. In Episode 28, a powerful type called  is summoned by Secretoru.

Cures' family members

Yui's mother who's the owner of Nagomi Diner.

Yui's father. He works as a fisherman with Monpei Shinada around the world.

Yui's late grandmother. She was the first to introduce the characteristic symbol of the maneki neko to Oishiina Town and is known for both her proverbs and her wisdom as well as her physical strength. In episode 38, she is revealed to be the narrator of the story of the series.

Kokone's mother.

Kokone's father.

Ran's father.

Ran's mother.

Ran's younger sister.

Ran's younger brother.

Amane's father.

Amane's mother.

 &  

Amane's older twin brothers.

Shinsen Middle School

Yui's classmate from the soccer club.

,  & 
 (Ena)
Kokone's friends.

A student from Shinsen Middle School. He tells a lot of lies to impress his classmates but in reality he suffers a lot from the lack of his older brother, who moved to study, who had looked after him since he was little as their parents were always too busy running the family shop.

The student council vice president at Shinsen Middle School.

Others

Takumi's mother who work at Nagomi Diner and the owner of Fuku-An.

Takumi's father. He works as a fisherman with Hikaru Nagomi around the world. He knows the world of CooKingdom and had previously entrusted Takumi with a Delicious Stone.

 

Kokone's butler.

An elderly lady who runs a traditional Japanese sweet shop.

 & 
 (Yosuke) & Rie Kawamura (Asae)
Two childhood friends and acquaintances of Takumi.

 & 
 (Takao) & Takako Tanaka (Miyako)
A married couple who run a yakisoba restaurant.

He is a guest of the "Churu Fest", an event in Oishiina Town which hosts noodles from all over the world. He met Ran's father during one of his trips.

The princess of the distant island Isuki, very similar to Yui except for the color of her eyes and her temper, composed and shy. Years earlier she had met Monpei who had told h.

Maira's butler.

Maira's evil older cousin who tries to oust her from the throne, deeming her incapable of holding the office of queen.

An old man who returns to visit Oishiina Town from time to time.

Matasaburo's grandson. His biggest dream is to become a professional baseball player.

A Japanese competitive eater.

 / 

A gourmet influencer.

Wakana's father with a passion for sport.

 / 

A blue-colored Pretty Cure.

Movie Characters
 

The director of Dreamia and the main antagonist of Delicious Party Pretty Cure the Movie: Dreaming Children's Lunch!

The robots of Dreamia.

Development
On November 4, 2021, Toei trademarked the name for the new series that will be released for the 2022 season. On November 25, 2021, the series title was officially unveiled on Toei's official website. The official website is then later updated on January 9, 2022, with new information and reveal of the main characters of the series. Regarding the main theme of the series, ABC Animation Producer Kanako Tada said that "Food and cooking is irreplaceable in life, and at the same time, it has many important elements that give color to everyday life. Through this work, the motto Yui Nagomi cherishes: 'Meals bring smiling faces' will surely be an important word for everyone." Toei Animation producer Yasumi Kaori also said that "Warm feelings will surely make you smile. The happiness and joy of 'sharing' smiles also opens up new smiles... With that in mind, I chose 'gratitude' and 'sharing' as the main theme, and 'food' as the center of the story."

The series also marks the debut role for Hana Hishikawa, in which she debuted her voice acting career back in 2020.

On March 11, 2022, Toei Animation announced a hiatus, due to its production being affected by a third party hack that had tampered with the studio's own files. It was later announced on March 13, 2022, that the show would be on hiatus for four weeks. On April 3, 2022, it was announced that the show would be on hiatus at least another week. On April 6, it was announced that the show would resume airing beginning on April 17.

Media

Anime

Delicious Party Pretty Cure officially aired on all ANN stations in Japan from February 6, 2022 to January 29, 2023, replacing Tropical-Rouge! Pretty Cure in its initial timeslot. Machico performed the series' opening theme  while Chihaya Yoshitake performed the first ending theme "Delicious Happy Days" and Rico Sasaki performed the second ending theme . Shiho Terada (Garo) returns to compose the music for the third time. Toei Animation Inc. licensed the series in North America and several select territories and began streaming on Crunchyroll the same day it premiered in Japan.

Films
A movie based on the anime,  was released in Japanese movie theaters on September 23, 2022.

A theatrical film titled  will premiere in Japanese theaters on September 15, 2023. Part of the Pretty Cure All Stars series of films, commemorating the franchise's 20th anniversary, it will feature all Pretty Cure teams from all 20 series.

Manga
A manga adaption series began serialization in Kodansha's Nakayoshi magazine from February 3 (March 2022 issue) to December 28, 2022 (February 2023 issue) and illustrated by Futago Kamikita.

References

External links
 Official website
 Official website (Asahi)
 

Pretty Cure
Cooking in anime and manga
2022 anime television series debuts
TV Asahi original programming
Toei Animation television
Crunchyroll anime
Magical girl anime and manga